Vicente Abad Santos (: 12 July 1916 – 30 December 1993) was a Filipino who served as an Associate Justice of the Supreme Court of the Philippines.

Profile
Abad Santos was born in San Fernando, Pampanga, a city in Central Luzon to a single mother Escolastica Abad Santos. The two maternal uncles were prominent Filipinos during the American period, Chief Justice José Abad Santos, and his brother Pedro, a leading socialist leader during the Commonwealth era.

Abad Santos earned his bachelor's degree and degree in law at the University of the Philippines in Manila before earning a master's degree at Harvard Law School in the United States. After serving briefly as a trial court judge, he joined the faculty of the University of the Philippines College of Law as its dean in 1958. He would serve as dean for the next 11 years.

Public service

Abad Santos was appointed Secretary (later Minister) of Justice by President Ferdinand Marcos in 1970. He would serve in that capacity until January 1979. As early as June 1977, he was appointed to the Supreme Court, but he deferred accepting the appointment until January 17, 1979, when he was finally seated on the High Court.

Long viewed as a supporter of Ferdinand Marcos, he displayed considerable independence from the Marcos government once he was seated on the Supreme Court. By 1986, he was asked by the anti-Marcos opposition to swear into office Corazon Aquino's vice-presidential candidate Salvador Laurel at the height of the EDSA Revolution. When Aquino assumed the presidency on February 25, 1986, she asked for the resignation of the incumbent justices of the Supreme Court to allow her a free hand in reorganizing the Court. Abad Santos and fellow incumbent Justice Claudio Teehankee were the President's first two appointments to the reorganized Supreme Court. However, Abad Santos retired shortly after, in July 1986, upon reaching the mandatory retirement age of 70.

See also

 José Abad Santos
 Pedro Abad Santos

Notes

References
 

Associate Justices of the Supreme Court of the Philippines
Secretaries of Justice of the Philippines
20th-century Filipino lawyers
Filipino educators
Harvard Law School alumni
1916 births
1993 deaths
Vicente
Kapampangan people
People from San Fernando, Pampanga
University of the Philippines Manila alumni
Ferdinand Marcos administration cabinet members
Academic staff of the University of the Philippines